Vratislava Nováková is a retired Czechoslovak slalom canoeist who competed in the early-to-mid 1960s. She won two medals in the mixed C-2 event at the ICF Canoe Slalom World Championships with a gold in 1961 and a bronze in 1963.

References

Czech female canoeists
Czechoslovak female canoeists
Possibly living people
Year of birth missing (living people)
Medalists at the ICF Canoe Slalom World Championships